The Central Railroad of New Jersey Terminal, also known as Communipaw Terminal and Jersey City Terminal, was the Central Railroad of New Jersey's waterfront passenger terminal in Jersey City, New Jersey. The terminal was built in 1889, replacing an earlier one that had been in use since 1864.  It operated until April 30, 1967.

It also serviced the Central Railroad of New Jersey-operated Reading Railroad, the Baltimore and Ohio Railroad, and the Lehigh Valley Railroad during various periods in its 78 years of operation.

The terminal was one of five passenger railroad terminals that lined the Hudson Waterfront during the 19th and 20th centuries, the others being Weehawken, Hoboken, Pavonia and Exchange Place, with Hoboken being the only station that is still in use, as of 2021.

The headhouse was renovated and incorporated into Liberty State Park. The station has been listed on the New Jersey Register of Historic Places and National Register of Historic Places since September 12, 1975. Additionally it is a New Jersey State Historic Site.

Description

The terminal is part of Liberty State Park, and along with nearby Ellis Island and Statue of Liberty recalls the era of massive immigration through the Port of New York and New Jersey. It is estimated that around 10.5 million entered the country through the station. The area has long been known as Communipaw, which in the Lenape language means big landing place at the side of a river. The first stop west of the station was indeed called Communipaw, and was not far from the village that had been established there in 1634 as part of the New Netherland settlement of Pavonia. The land on which the extensive yards were built was reclaimed, or filled. The terminal itself is next to the Morris Canal Big Basin, which to some degree was made obsolete by the railroads which replaced it. The long cobbled road which ends at the terminal (once called Johnston Avenue for a president of CNJ) is named Audrey Zapp Drive, after the environmentalist active in the creation of the park.

The main building is designed in a Richardsonian Romanesque style. The intermodal facility contains more than a dozen platforms and several ferry slips. Arriving passengers would walk to the railhead concourse and could either pass through its main waiting room, by-pass it on either side, and take stairs to the upper level. The ferry slips have also been restored though the structure which housed them has been removed, as have the tracks. The Bush-type trainsheds, the largest ever to be constructed and designed by A. Lincoln Bush, were not part of the original construction, but were built in 1914 and have not been restored. The abandoned shed covered 12 platforms and 20 tracks.

Service

Trackage
The terminal, along with its docks and yards, was one of several massive terminal complexes (the other being the terminals of the Pennsylvania Railroad in Exchange Place, the Erie Railroad Terminal in Pavonia, the Lackawanna Railroad Terminal in Hoboken, and the West Shore Railroad Terminal in Weehawken) that dominated the western waterfront of the New York Harbor from the mid 19th to the mid 20th century. Of the two still standing, the Hoboken Terminal (the former Lackwanna Railroad Terminal) is the only one still in use. Lines from the station headed to the southwest. Arriving at the waterfront from the points required overcoming significant natural obstacles including crossing the Hackensack River and Meadows and Hudson Palisades, and in the case of New Jersey Central, traversing the Newark Bay. For its mainline, the railroad constructed the Newark Bay Bridge to Elizabeth.  Its Newark and New York Branch cut through Bergen Hill and crossed two bridges at Kearny Point. Both rights-of-way in Hudson County are now used by the Hudson Bergen Light Rail, one terminating at West Side Avenue and the other at 8th Street station in Bayonne.

Ferries and ships

The Communipaw ferry constituted the main ferry route from the terminal and was operated by four ferries that crossed the North River to Liberty Street Ferry Terminal in lower Manhattan. Additional service to 23rd Street was also operated until the CRNJ went bankrupt in 1945 and scrapped its ferry boats used on the 23rd street route in 1947. In the early 1900s the B&O Railroad requested the CRNJ operate ferries for its luxury Royal Blue service passengers to Whitehall Terminal and this was accomplished for several years until the City of New York purchased the Staten Island Ferry from the B&O's subsidiary, the Staten Island Railway, and ended the service in 1905.

In 1941, the CRRNJ ferryboat fleet made 374 one-way crossings of the North River each day.

Railroad lines

Jersey Central's Blue Comet offered elaborate service to Atlantic City. The railroad's suburban trains served passengers to west and south, including the Jersey Shore. CNJ's long-distance service into Pennsylvania ran to Harrisburg, Scranton, and Mauch Chunk.

The Reading Company used the terminal for its Crusader and Wall Street trains. The Baltimore and Ohio Railroad (B&O), whose Royal Blue was a premier passenger train to Washington, DC, also had trains to Chicago and St. Louis.

In April 1967 the opening of the Aldene Connection led to the end of passenger service to the station and the diverting of all remaining passenger trains to Penn Station in Newark. Since then, Hoboken Terminal has served as the main commuter rail station for Jersey City as well; it straddles the Jersey City/Hoboken line.

The timetable of 27 September 1936 shows 132 weekday departures, including 25 to CNJ's Broad St. Newark station, 25 that ran south from Elizabethport (two to Chrome and the rest to the NY&LB) and 19 Reading and B&O trains that turned southwest at Bound Brook Junction. Three trains ran to Mauch Chunk and two to Harrisburg via Allentown; the other 58 trains terminated along the main line between West 8th St in Bayonne and Hampton.

Named passenger trains
Until April 1958 several long-distance trains originated at the station, and trains to Philadelphia lasted until 1967.

&ast; With the closing of Baltimore & Ohio passenger service north of Baltimore in 1958 the Royal Blue was abandoned and the Capitol Limited, Metropolitan Special and National Limited were terminated east of Baltimore.

Post-railroad service uses
Following the Aldene Connection's opening in 1967, the terminal sat unused but maintained and guarded by the Central Railroad of New Jersey. When CNJ shops and engine facilities nearby closed in the early 1970s, the terminal sat abandoned.

A portion of the 1968 movie Funny Girl was filmed at the terminal. Numerous fairs, concerts, and other sponsored events (among them the Central Jersey Heritage Festival and the All Points West Music & Arts Festival) take place at the station and its grounds. It is a very popular place from which to view July 4 fireworks. In the aftermath of the September 11 attacks, its parking lot was the staging area for dozens of ambulances that were mobilized to transport victims of the attacks.

Ferries to the Statue of Liberty National Monument, Ellis Island, and Liberty Island depart daily. No public transport options exist between the terminal and Hudson Bergen Light Rail's Liberty State Park Station.  In 2009 Rutgers University students proposed building a trolley line to the terminal building and other points in the park from the light rail station to improve access.

The terminal was badly damaged by flooding during Hurricane Sandy in 2012 and was reopened in 2016.

On Election Day 2020, an episode of the political program Fox & Friends was filmed in a portable studio placed outside the terminal. Promotional footage for the episode frequently features the terminal.

Gallery

See also

 National Register of Historic Places listings in Hudson County, New Jersey
 Operating Passenger Railroad Stations Thematic Resource (New Jersey)
 Timeline of Jersey City area railroads
 List of ferries across the Hudson River in New York City
 List of stations on the Central Railroad of New Jersey
 National Limited
 Central Railroad of New Jersey Freight Station
 Newark Bay, New Jersey rail accident
 Newark and New York Railroad Bridge

References

External links

 

Railway stations in the United States opened in 1864
Railway stations in the United States opened in 1889
Railway stations closed in 1967
Buildings and structures in Jersey City, New Jersey
Former Central Railroad of New Jersey stations
Ferry terminals in New Jersey
Former railway stations in New Jersey
Hudson River
Museums in Hudson County, New Jersey
Railway stations on the National Register of Historic Places in New Jersey
Railroad museums in New Jersey
Richardsonian Romanesque architecture in New Jersey
Former Baltimore and Ohio Railroad stations
Transit hubs serving New Jersey
Railway stations in Hudson County, New Jersey
Historic American Engineering Record in New Jersey
Former Lehigh Valley Railroad stations
National Register of Historic Places in Hudson County, New Jersey
New Jersey Register of Historic Places
Union stations in the United States
Ferry terminals on the National Register of Historic Places
Transportation buildings and structures on the National Register of Historic Places in New Jersey
Railway stations serving harbours and ports